Jason Robert Hardtke (born September 15, 1971 in Milwaukee, Wisconsin) is an American former professional baseball second baseman.

Drafted by the Cleveland Indians in the 3rd round of the 1990 MLB draft. Hardtke made his MLB debut with the New York Mets on September 8, and appear in his final MLB game on July 13, .

He also played in Nippon Professional Baseball (NPB) for the Hanshin Tigers in the  season, and has managed the Visalia Rawhide. He is the president of a baseball training academy in Campbell, California, Hardtke World of Baseball.

References

External links

Hardtke World of Baseball

1971 births
Living people
American expatriate baseball players in Japan
Baseball players at the 1999 Pan American Games
Baseball players from Milwaukee
Binghamton Mets players
Buffalo Bisons (minor league) players
Burlington Indians players (1986–2006)
Charlotte Knights players
Chicago Cubs players
Colorado Springs Sky Sox players
Columbus Indians players
Hanshin Tigers players
High Desert Mavericks players
Indianapolis Indians players
Iowa Cubs players
Kinston Indians players
Major League Baseball replacement players
Major League Baseball second basemen
New York Mets players
Norfolk Tides players
Pan American Games medalists in baseball
Pan American Games silver medalists for the United States
People from Campbell, California
Rancho Cucamonga Quakes players
United States national baseball team players
Waterloo Diamonds players
Wichita Wranglers players
Medalists at the 1999 Pan American Games